The Litoměřická wine sub-region is one of six wine sub-regions in the Czech Republic. It is situated on the Elbe river, with its centre in the town of Litoměřice. This area contains 29 official wine municipalities. The history of winery in this north-Bohemian region is longer than 1,000 years.

References

Wine regions of the Czech Republic
Central Bohemian Region
Ústí nad Labem Region
Czech wine